is a traditional (koryū) school of Japanese martial arts founded in 1368 CE by the samurai Sōma Shiro Yoshimoto (c.14th century) in modern-day Nagano Prefecture, where Yoshimoto is said to have taught only fourteen students until his death.

References 

Ko-ryū bujutsu
Japanese martial arts
1368 establishments in Asia
1360s establishments in Japan